Loyiso Macdonald (born 7 September 1986), is a South African actor. He is best known for his roles in the popular serials The Queen, 3 Way Junction and Happy Family.

Personal life
He was born on the 7 September 1986 in the Eastern Cape, South Africa. He studied at Pinetown Boys' High School.

He is married to longtime partner musician Luphiwo Mathunzi, after six years of dating. He met Luphiwo during the performance of stage play Othello produced by Think Theatre in Johannesburg. The wedding was celebrated on 30 September 2012 at Luphiwo's home in Mpumalanga in a traditional ceremony.

Career
Before entering acting, he worked for a bank and a telecommunications Call Centre. However without any satisfaction in the job, he quit in 2007. Then he was invited to perform in many stage plays. Later he joined the Mzansi Magic show The Queen which became very popular and made his mark in South African television.

At the Durban film school, he studied speech and drama. Then he worked with the Durban Theatre for four years. Then he moved to Johannesburg in 2011. At the iZulu Theatre in Sibaya Casino, he made several performances. He then appeared in the plays Kiss of the Spider Woman, Othello, Escape from Nombiland, and Man Up a Tree. Then he acted in the soap opera Isidingo in April 2012 with the supportive role 'Ntando Sibeko'. He has also acted in the serials Intersexions, Zabalaza and Rockville.

Filmography

References

External links
 

Living people
South African male television actors
1986 births
South African male film actors
People from the Eastern Cape